The 2004 Libertarian Party presidential primaries allowed voters to indicate non-binding preferences for the Libertarian Party's presidential candidate. These differed from the Republican or Democratic presidential primaries and caucuses in that they did not appoint delegates to represent a candidate at the party's convention to select the party's nominee for the United States presidential election. The party's nominee for the 2004 presidential election was chosen directly by registered delegates at the 2004 Libertarian National Convention, which ran from May 28 to 31, 2008. The delegates nominated Michael Badnarik for president and Richard Campagna for vice president.

Five primaries were held. A total of 26,701 votes were cast in these primaries.

Candidates

Primaries and caucuses

Missouri primary 

In the Wisconsin primary on February 3, the Libertarian Party had a state-run primary held alongside the Democratic, Republican primaries.

Wisconsin primary 

In the Wisconsin primary on February 17, the Libertarian Party had a state-run primary held alongside the Democratic, Republican primaries.

California primary 
Type: Semi-Closed

In the California primary on March 2, the Libertarian Party had a state-run primary held alongside those for the Republicans, Democrats, the Green Party, and the Peace and Freedom Party.

Massachusetts primary 

In the Massachusetts primary on March 2, the Libertarian Party had a state-run primary held alongside the Democratic, Republican, and Green primaries.

Nebraska primary 

In the Nebraska primary on May 11, the Libertarian Party had a state-run primary held alongside the Democratic and Republican primaries.

2004 National Convention

See also
Presidential primaries
 2004 Democratic Party presidential primaries
 2004 Green Party presidential primaries
 2004 Republican Party presidential primaries

National Conventions
 2008 Constitution Party National Convention
 2004 Libertarian National Convention
 2004 Green National Convention
 2004 Democratic National Convention
 2004 Republican National Convention

Notes

References

Presidential primaries, 2004
2004 United States presidential primaries